Government Polytechnic, Hyderabad, formerly Osmania Central Technical College, is a co-educational institution of higher learning located in Hyderabad of Telangana. The Institute was established in 1923 and re-located in 1954.

History 
This institution is one of the oldest polytechnics in the state, was established in 1923 with two branches Electrical and Mechanical. Originally named as Osmania Central Technical College and located in the Mint Compound at Masab Tank. In 1931, it was renamed as Osmania Technical College. After India gained independence in 1947, the institution's name was changed to Government Polytechnic Hyderabad in 1954 and technical courses were introduced with two branches of study: Civil, and Automobile. In 1957, a course in the branch of telecommunications (electronics) was added. The institution was shifted to the present campus at Masab Tank in the academic year 1960–61. Subsequently, a diploma in pharmacy was introduced in 1971–72. A diploma in computers was introduced in 1986–87.

National Cadet Corps 
This institute also has National Cadet Corps scheme for better development of students, enriching their overall personality.

Hostels for accommodation 
There is a boys hostel beside the college with capacity for 440 and a girls hostel built internally in the college with capacity for 80.

References

Universities and colleges in Hyderabad, India
1923 establishments in India
Educational institutions established in 1923